Struck by Lightning may refer to:

 Lightning strike
 Struck by Lightning (1990 film)
 Struck by Lightning (2012 film)
 Struck by Lightning (TV series)
 Struck by Lightning (album)